Matthew Harris Jouett (Mercer County, Kentucky, 22 April 1788 – Lexington, Kentucky, 10 August 1827) was a noted American portrait painter, famous for painting portraits including Thomas Jefferson, George Rogers Clark and Lafayette.

Personal life and career
Jouett was the son of Sallie Robards and Jack Jouett, a hero of the American Revolution. The elder Jouett sent his son to Transylvania University and encouraged him to study law, but Matthew spent much of his time painting. The frustrated father commented "I sent Matthew to college to make a gentleman of him, and he has turned out to be nothing but a damned sign painter."

Jouett served as a volunteer officer of the 28th Kentucky Infantry in the War of 1812 and was among the survivors of the River Raisin Massacre. The company payroll of $6000 disappeared during the slaughter. Jouett restored the missing funds to the militia, based on his earnings as a painter. He also painted portraits of his fellow soldiers from memory, including Hart and Colonel Allen.

Matthew Harris Jouett married Margaret "Peggy" Henderson Allen of Lexington, Kentucky on May 25, 1812. They had nine children. One of their sons was James Edward Jouett, a naval officer. James served with Admiral David Farragut and was immortalized in Farragut's famous quote "Damn the torpedoes! Four bells! Captain Drayton go ahead! Jouett full speed!" Jouett was promoted to captain during the War of 1812. Afterwards, he studied portraiture and went to Boston to study with Gilbert Stuart in 1816.

He painted in New Orleans from 1817 to 1827 during the winter season and was listed in the 1824 New Orleans Directory as a portrait painter working at 49 Canal Street. He was commissioned by the Kentucky legislature to paint a portrait of the Marquis de Lafayette. Jouett also painted Thomas Jefferson and the child Catherine Cornelia Prather.

It wasn't until the 1893 Chicago World Fair, that his fame as a painter began. His paintings were greatly appreciated by the curators and the general public. His work is more collectible today than it was during his lifetime, and as such catches higher prices.
Jouett became one of the most highly esteemed portrait painters in the United States, honored with a major centenary exhibition at the Speed Museum in his home state.

Matthew Jouett died in Lexington, Kentucky in 1827 is buried in Cave Hill Cemetery.

Selected works

References

Sources
 
 Floyd, William Barrow. Matthew Harris Jouett: Portraitist of the Ante-Bellum South. 1980. Transylvania Printing Company, Lexington, KY.
 Mills, Sally. "Jouett, Matthew Harris." In Grove Art Online. Oxford Art Online, (accessed January 4, 2012; subscription required).

External links

 Matthew Harris Jouett at National Gallery of Art
 Entry for Matthew Harris Jouett on the Union List of Artist Names
 Matthew Harris Jouett on Artcyclopedia (with links to works in various museum collections)
 Jack Jouett House Historic Site, Versailles, KY
 Entry for Matthew Jouett in the archive of the Collins Collection

1788 births
1827 deaths
19th-century American painters
19th-century American male artists
American male painters
Painters from Kentucky
People from Mercer County, Kentucky
Transylvania University alumni
Burials at Cave Hill Cemetery
United States Army officers
American militiamen in the War of 1812
Jouett family